Training Command is the Indian Air Force's command responsible for flying and ground training.

In the 1930s, the approaching threat and later advent of World War II and the leaning of Japan towards the Axis powers, the latter was considered as a potential enemy.  Therefore, need was felt to make IAF a self-supporting force for the South Eastern Theatre of war.  This led to the rapid expansion of the IAF.  A target was fixed of 10 IAF Squadrons.  With this expansion, the requirement of pilots and technical personnel increased.  For the training of technical personnel, a technical training school was set up at Ambala in 1940.

In a 1949 reorganisation of the Indian Air Force, while frontline units were put under the Operations Command, all the training institutions were placed under the jurisdiction of the Training Command.

Among Training Command's units is the Navigation Training School at Begumpet Air Force Station, Hyderabad. It flies the BAe HS. 748, the Basic Flying Training School and the Air Force Administrative College. The Hawk Operational Training Squadron and  Weapon System Operators' School are located at Bidar Air Force Station which flows the Hawk Mk 132 trainer aircraft.

Air Officer Commanding-in-Chief

See also
 Maintenance Command

Notes

Sources 
 

Commands of the Indian Air Force
Military units and formations of the Indian Air Force